The 1926 Western State Normal Hilltoppers football team was an American football team that represented Western State Normal School (later renamed Western Michigan University) during the 1926 college football season. In their third season under head coach Earl Martineau, the Hilltoppers compiled a 7–1 record, shut out five opponents, and outscored all opponents by a combined total of 132 to 20. Fullback Frank Banach was the team captain.

Schedule

References

Western State Normal
Western Michigan Broncos football seasons
Western State Normal Hilltoppers football